The Suwannee Correctional Institution (also SUWCI) is a Level 6 security prison facility for adult males at Live Oak, Florida, two miles west of Wellborn. The camp was established in 2009.  The total staff is 724 (as of April 13, 2014) and it has a capacity of 1,505 prisoners. There was an FBI investigation after the death of a prisoner in 2014.

The nearby Suwannee Correctional Institution Annex was established in 2010.  It holds another 1,346 inmates at the same security level.

Notable Inmates
Craig Price (murderer) - Serial killer from Rhode Island.

References

Prisons in Florida
Penal system in Florida
2009 establishments in Florida